Education Reform Act may refer to:

 Education Reform Act 1988 in the UK
 Kentucky Education Reform Act, 1990
 Massachusetts Education Reform Act of 1993